In mathematics, Gray's conjecture is a conjecture made by Brayton Gray in 1984 about maps between loop spaces of spheres. It was later proved by John Harper.

References

Algebraic topology
Conjectures that have been proved